Little Aston Hall is a Georgian country house in Little Aston, Staffordshire, England.

The original hall building is Grade II listed. It was constructed around 1730 by Richard Scott of nearby Great Barr Hall, in a Georgian style with a park and lake.  The house was restyled by architect James Wyatt for William Tennant in the early 19th century.  It was enlarged and improved at a reputed cost of £35,000 in 1857 by Hon Edward Swynfen Parker Jervis, younger son of Edward Jervis Jervis, 2nd Viscount St Vincent and great nephew of Admiral of the Fleet John Jervis, 1st Earl of St Vincent, the naval hero of the 1797 Battle of Cape St Vincent.

The hall was sold to Harry Scribbans with only  and the remaining land was sold at auction piecemeal. Unoccupied from 1950, the house became the Midlands regional headquarters of Esso in 1954, later the Head Office of Birfield Ltd.  In 1966 it was acquired by GKN.

In 1984 the site was redeveloped.  The original hall was converted into seven superior residential apartments, whilst retaining its external appearance.  In addition seven new modern style double blocks each of six apartments were built in the grounds overlooking the lake, giving 49 apartments, most occupied by retirees.  Further development of eight large detached houses known as Lakeside occurred alongside the apartments.  In the 2000s around 100 apartments known as Lady Aston Park exclusively for the over 55s were built.  A BUPA residential care home and private BUPA hospital followed.

External links
BUPA Hospital Little Aston
BUPA Residential Care and Nursing Home Aston Court

Gone Are The Days - A History of Little Aston & surrounding Area  Ted Hiscock. Storm Publishing.   1986.

Country houses in Staffordshire
Grade II listed buildings in Staffordshire